Ḷḷumés (Limés in Spanish) is one of 54 parish councils in Cangas del Narcea, a municipality within the province and autonomous community of Asturias, in northern Spain. It is known for it's wine.

Villages
 L'Ardalí
 Las Barzanieḷḷas
 Castru de Ḷḷumés
 Fonceca
 La Imera
 Ḷḷumés
 Moral
 Pixán
 Pontón
 Ponticieḷḷa
 Viḷḷarín de Ḷḷumés

References

Parishes in Cangas del Narcea